= Yamamoto Reservoir =

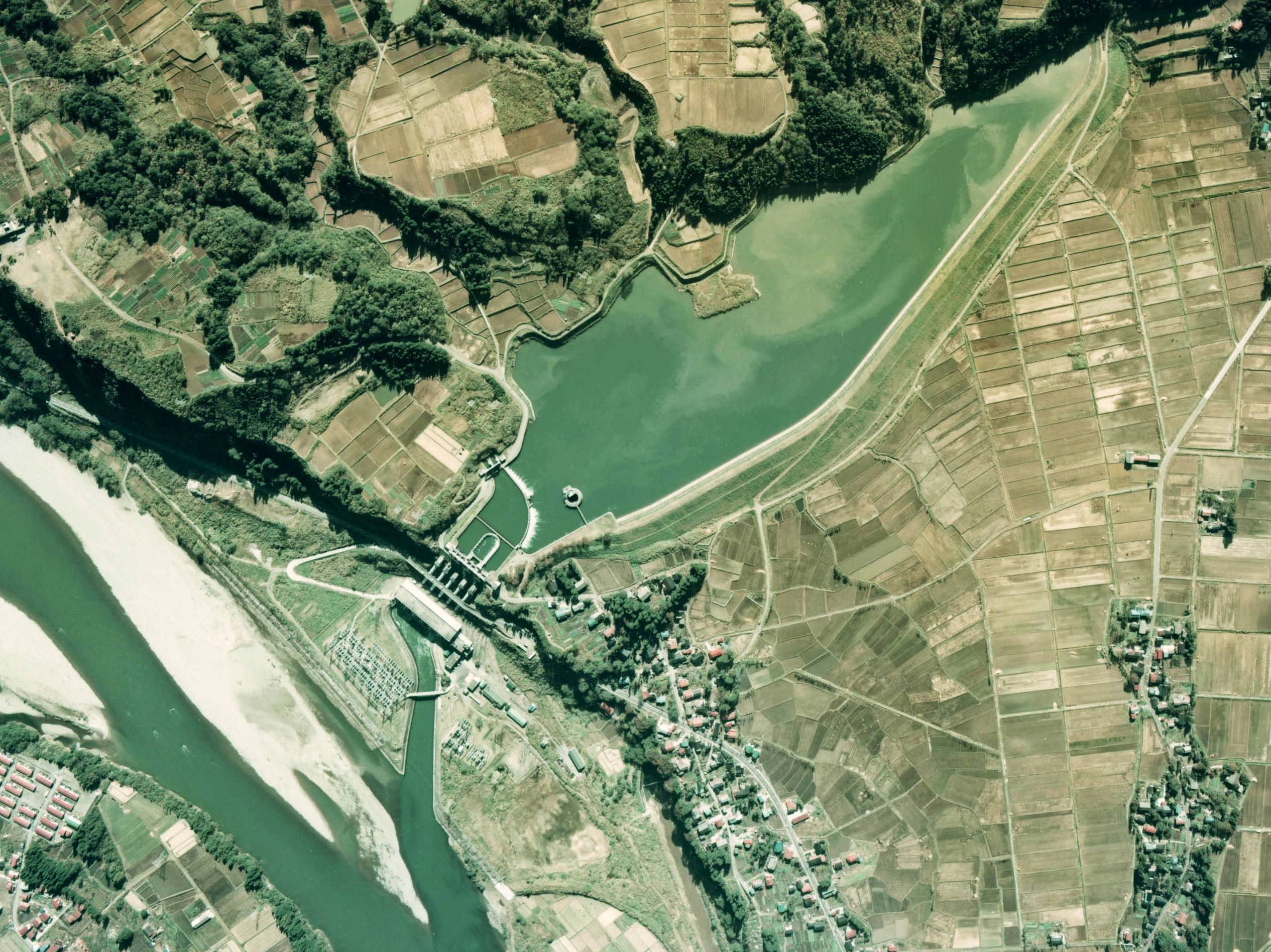
- Interactive map of Yamamoto Reservoir
- Location: Niigata Prefecture, Japan

Yamamoto Reservoir (山本調整池, Yamamoto chōseike) is a reservoir in Niigata Prefecture, Japan. It is located in Central Japan near the Niigata Hillside Prefecture and towards the coastline.
